Blankety Blank: A Memoir of Vulgaria (2005) is a novel by American author D. Harlan Wilson.

The novel critiques the idea of the memoir as a form of truth-telling and problematizes history and narrative itself as possible modes of truth.  It contains various “short histories” and literary devices that are flagrantly inaccurate or misguided, all in a way that underscores the constructedness of the human condition, as well as humanity's collective racist tendencies.

References

External links
 Review by ‘’ForeWord Magazine’’
 Review by ‘’ChiZine’’
 Review by ‘’decomP Magazine’’
 Review by ‘’Sussurus Magazine’’

2008 American novels
Novels by D. Harlan Wilson
Postmodern novels
Novels set in Michigan